Isoperla carbonaria is a species of stonefly in the family Perlodidae.

Description
Isoperla carbonaria is a rheophilous species characterised by relatively small size, reaching a length of about 10–13 mm. The basis colour is yellowish. The larvae of this predaceous stonefly mainly feed on Chironomidae, actively hunted across the surface of the substratum.

Distribution
This species is present in France, Italy and Switzerland.

Habitat
In the immature stage Isoperla carbonaria is aquatic and lives in freshwater, while as an adult is terrestrial and flying.

References

External links

 
 Arctos
 Global Species
 BioLib
 PESI
 ZipCodeZoo
 
 Perlodidae Species Listing

Perlodidae
Insects of Europe